Herniarin is a natural chemical compound. Chemically, it can be considered a methoxy derivative of coumarin or a methyl derivative of umbelliferone.

Herniarin is  found in Herniaria glabra, Ayapana triplinervis and in species of the genus Prunus (P. mahaleb, P. pensylvanica, and P. maximowiczii).

References 

O-methylated coumarins